Mount Tinemaha is a  mountain summit located east of the crest of the Sierra Nevada mountain range, in Inyo County of northern California. It is situated on the eastern boundary of the John Muir Wilderness, on land managed by Inyo National Forest. It is 1.3 mile southeast of Tinemaha Lake, and 1.8 mile northeast of parent Split Mountain.

History
This mountain's name was officially adopted in 1937 by the U.S. Board on Geographic Names to honor the legendary Paiute chief, Tinemaha. The peak was known by this name to the early prospectors and cattlemen of Owens Valley. The first ascent of the summit was made July 1, 1937, by Chester Versteeg, a prominent Sierra Club member. Chester Versteeg submitted the name to the board for consideration.

Climate
According to the Köppen climate classification system, Mount Tinemaha has an alpine climate. Most weather fronts originate in the Pacific Ocean, and travel east toward the Sierra Nevada mountains. As fronts approach, they are forced upward by the peaks, causing them to drop their moisture in the form of rain or snowfall onto the range (orographic lift). Precipitation runoff from this mountain drains to Red Mountain Creek and Tinemaha Creek, thence Tinemaha Reservoir.

Gallery

See also

 List of mountain peaks of California
 Mono people

References

External links

 Weather forecast: Mount Tinemaha

Inyo National Forest
Mountains of Inyo County, California
Mountains of the John Muir Wilderness
North American 3000 m summits
Mountains of Northern California
Sierra Nevada (United States)